"Laurie" is a short story by Stephen King, first published on his website on May 17, 2018.

Plot summary 

Lloyd Sunderland is a 65 year-old retiree living in the (fictional) island community of Caymen Key, Florida who has become depressed and lost weight after his wife Marian died from a glioblastoma six months prior. One September, he is visited by his older sister, Beth, who gifts him a Border Collie-Mudi puppy out of concern for his wellbeing. Lloyd is initially unwilling to accept the dog but ultimately agrees to look after her on a trial basis, naming her "Laurie". 

Lloyd gradually bonds with Laurie as he looks after her, and in mid-October he tells Beth that he will keep her. He finds his physical and mental health improving, and begins eating more healthily and sleeping better. He also resumes working part-time as an accountant. He regularly takes Laurie for walks along "Six Mile Path", a boardwalk running alongside a canal.

On December 6, Lloyd's neighbor Evelyn Pitcher asks him if he has seen her husband, Lloyd's friend Don. While walking along Six Mile Path with Laurie, Lloyd finds Don's cane - cracked and dotted with blood - next to a section of the Path that has been overgrown with palmetto. After Laurie pulls free of Lloyd and runs under the palmetto - which is also bloodied - Lloyds follows and finds her confronting a 10 foot long alligator, which has killed and partially eaten Don. After Lloyd commands Laurie to go home, he is attacked by the alligator. After Lloyd hits the alligator with Don's cane, the boardwalk partially collapses, dumping the alligator into the canal and enabling Lloyds to escape with Laurie, who has waited for him on the other side of the palmetto. Lloyd calls the police, who notify Evelyn that Don has been killed. 

Two days after the incident, Lloyd is visited by Gibson, a game warden with the Florida Fish and Wildlife Conservation Commission. Gibson informs Lloyd that the alligator has been captured and that it had been hidden alongside the boardwalk for several weeks, guarding a clutch of eggs. Lloyd speculates that Don provoked an attack by unintentionally hitting the alligator while swinging his cane.

The story ends with Lloyd wondering what Laurie sees when she looks at his face and reflecting "It was life, you were stuck with it, and all you could do was live it."

Publication 
"Laurie" was first published on King's website on May 17, 2018. An audio recording was included on the audiobook version of Elevation, which was released later that year.

References

See also 
 Stephen King short fiction bibliography

External links 
 "Laurie" at StephenKing.com

2018 short stories
Florida in fiction
Horror short stories
Short stories about dogs
Short stories by Stephen King